The Republic of Užice was a short-lived liberated Yugoslav territory and the first liberated territory in World War II Europe, organized as a military mini-state that existed in the autumn of 1941 in occupied Yugoslavia, more specifically the western part of the Territory of the Military Commander in Serbia. The Republic was established by the Partisan resistance movement and its administrative center was in the town of Užice.

Borders 

The Republic of Užice comprised a large portion of western part of the occupied territory and had a population of more than 300,000 (according to another source, nearly one million). It was located between the Valjevo–Bajina Bašta line in the north, the river Drina on the west, the river Zapadna Morava in the east, and the Raška region to the south.

Different sources provide differing information about the size of the republic: according to some sources, it included 15,000 or 20,000 square kilometres.

History 

The government was made of "people's councils" (odbori), and the partisans opened schools and published a newspaper, Borba (meaning "Struggle"). They even managed to run a postal system and around 145 km of railway and operated an ammunition factory from the vaults beneath the bank in Užice.

In November 1941, in the First anti-Partisan offensive, the German troops occupied this territory again, while the majority of Partisan forces escaped towards Bosnia, Sandžak and Montenegro, re-grouping at Foča in Bosnia.

End 

The leftist policy then pursued by Josip Broz Tito (known later as the leftist errors) substantially contributed to the defeat of the partisans in the Republic of Užice. Because of the pro-fascist Serbian propaganda which described the partisans as being led by foreigners, the population of Serbia turned against the uprising and against the partisan insurgents. At the beginning of December 1941
the partisans moved from Serbia to Bosnia (nominally part of the NDH) and joined their comrades who had already left Montenegro.

In popular culture 

The 1974 Yugoslav partisan feature film The Republic of Užice covers the events surrounding the existence of the Republic of Užice.

See also 
Republic of Bihać, a similar, albeit created 1 year later, republic in Serbia.
Former countries in Europe after 1815

References 
Notes

Footnotes

Bibliography

Further reading 
Venceslav Glišić, Užička republika, Belgrade, 1986.
Jovan Radovanović, 67 dana Užičke republike (67 дана Ужичке републике), Belgrade, 1972. (1st edition, 1961.)
Boško N. Kostić, Za istoriju naših dana, Lille, France, 1949.

External links 
Modern Serbia - Revolution and the antifascist struggle at Encyclopædia Britannica.
Opština Užice
Western Serbia
National Museum Uzice

1941 disestablishments in Europe
Uzice, Republic of
Uzice, Republic of
Uzice, Republic of
States and territories established in 1941
1941 establishments in Europe
Užice